Augusta Lagostena Bassi (named Tina) (2 March 1926 – 4 March 2008) was an Italian lawyer, an Italian deputy for the Forza Italia party, a media personality and a writer.

Professional career
She earned a law degree and taught as an assistant professor at Genoa University and then as professor of navigation law at Parma University. She worked in Italian Justice Department at Reform Office from 1973 - 1975 as a consultant and continued her career as a lawyer.  She was particularly famous as for her work on cases involving women's rights.  In 1983, she was the Italian delegate at the World Conference for Peace in Prague. She was also one of the founders of "Telefono Rosa" (in English "Pink Telephone"), an association that assists female victims of brutality.

Political career
She was elected deputy of the Italian Chamber of Deputies in XII republican Parliament of Italy as a member of the  Forza Italia party. She was additionally President of Italian National Committee for Equal Chance, member of the European Union   Equal Opportunity Committee, member of the  Justice Committee in Italian Parliament,  delegate at Peking Conference for Women's Rights and assistant supervisor of the new Italian Law against sexual violence.

Work in TV
In 1993, for RAI, she wrote the scenography for the television production "L'avvocato delle donne" ("The Women's Lawyer"), starring actress Mariangela Melato. She then wrote of book of the same title. From 1998 until her death, she was an arbitration judge on the TV show "Forum" on Mediaset Rete 4. She also hosted a Talk show "Tina-mite", on the Italian TV network "Odeon".  In 2006, she was named Honorary Provost of the Popular University of Milan.

Death
She died in Rome in a private hospital after a long illness two days following her 82nd birthday.

References

 (in Italian)
 - article (in Italian)
 - article (in English)

1926 births
2008 deaths
Italian women lawyers
Italian writers
Members of the Chamber of Deputies (Italy)
Academic staff of the University of Genoa
Academic staff of the University of Parma
20th-century Italian lawyers